Hydrogen technologies are technologies that relate to the production and use of hydrogen as a part hydrogen economy. Hydrogen technologies are applicable for many uses.

Some hydrogen technologies are carbon neutral and could have a role in preventing climate change and a possible future hydrogen economy. Hydrogen is a chemical widely used in various applications including ammonia production, oil refining and energy. The most common methods for producing hydrogen on an industrial scale are: Steam reforming, oil reforming, coal gasification, water electrolysis. 

Hydrogen is not a primary energy source, because it is not naturally occurring as a fuel.  It is, however, widely regarded as an ideal energy storage medium, due to the ease with which electricity can convert water into hydrogen and oxygen through electrolysis and can be converted back to electrical power using a fuel cell. There are a wide number of different types of fuel and electrolysis cells.

The potential environmental impact depends primarily on the methods used to generate hydrogen as a fuel.

Fuel cells

Alkaline fuel cell (AFC)
Direct borohydride fuel cell (DBFC)
Direct carbon fuel cell (DCFC)
Direct ethanol fuel cell (DEFC)
Direct methanol fuel cell (DMFC)
Electro-galvanic fuel cell (EGFC)
Flow battery (RFC)
Formic acid fuel cell (FAFC)
Metal hydride fuel cell (MHFC)
Microbial fuel cell (MFC)
Molten carbonate fuel cell (MCFC)
Phosphoric acid fuel cell (PAFC)
Photoelectrochemical cell (PEC)
Proton exchange membrane fuel cell (PEMFC)
Protonic ceramic fuel cell (PCFC)
Regenerative fuel cell (RFC)
Solid oxide fuel cell (SOFC)

Hydrogen infrastructure

Hydrogen plant (Steam reformer)
Hydrogen pipeline transport
Hydrogen pressure letdown station
Compressed hydrogen tube trailer
Liquid hydrogen tank truck
Hydrogen piping
Hydrogen station
HCNG
Homefueler
Home Energy Station
Hydrogen highway
Zero Regio
Hydrogen compressor
Electrochemical hydrogen compressor
Guided rotor compressor
Hydride compressor
Ionic liquid piston compressor
Linear compressor
Hydrogen turboexpander-generator
Hydrogen leak testing
Hydrogen sensor
Hydrogen purifier
Hydrogen analyzer
Hydrogen valve

Hydrogen storage

Compressed hydrogen
Cryo-adsorption
Liquid hydrogen
Slush hydrogen
Underground hydrogen storage
Hydrogen tank
Power to gas

Hydrogen vehicles

Historic hydrogen filled airships
Hindenburg (airship)
Zeppelin

Hydrogen powered cars

Audi:
 2004 – Audi A2H2-hybrid vehicle
 2009 – Audi Q5-FCEV

BMW:
 2002 – BMW 750hl
 2010 – BMW 1 Series Fuel-cell hybrid electric

Chrysler:
 2000 – Jeep Commander II-hybrid vehicle-Commercial
 2001 – Chrysler Natrium-hybrid vehicle
 2003 – Jeep Treo-Fuel cell

Daimler:
 1994 – Mercedes-Benz NECAR 1
 1996 – Mercedes-Benz NECAR 2
 1997 – Mercedes-Benz NECAR 3
 1999 – Mercedes-Benz NECAR 4
 2000 – Mercedes-Benz NECAR 5
 2002 – Mercedes-Benz F-Cell based on the Mercedes-Benz A-Class
 2005 – Mercedes-Benz F600 Hygenius
 2009 – Mercedes-Benz F-CELL Roadster
 2009 – Mercedes-Benz F-Cell based on the Mercedes-Benz B-Class

Fiat:
 2001 – Fiat Seicento Elettra H2 Fuel Cell-hybrid vehicle
 2003 – Fiat Seicento Hydrogen-hybrid vehicle
 2005 – Fiat Panda Hydrogen-Fuel cell
 2008 – Fiat Phyllis-Fuel cell
 2008 – Fiat Panda-Fiat Panda HyTRAN

Ford:
 2000 – Ford Focus FCV-Fuel cell.  Note however that  Ford Motor Company has dropped its plans to develop hydrogen cars, stating that "The next major step in Ford’s plan is to increase over time the volume of electrified vehicles".
 2006 – F-250 Super Chief a Tri-Flex engine concept pickup.

Forze Hydrogen-Electric Racing Team Delft
2016 – Forze-Fuel cell

General Motors:
 1966 – GM Electrovan-Fuel cell
 2001 – HydroGen3-Fuel cell
 2002 – GM HyWire-Fuel cell
 2005 – GM Sequel-hybrid vehicle
 2006 – Chevrolet Equinox Fuel Cell
 2007 – HydroGen4
Honda:
 2002 – Honda FCX – hybrid vehicle
 2007 – Honda FCX Clarity – Hydrogen Fuel cell – Production model

Hyundai:
 2001 – Hyundai Santa Fe FCEV
 2010 – Hyundai ix35 FCEV

Lotus Engineering:
 2010 – Black Cab-Fuel cell

Kia:
 2009 – Kia Borrego FCEV-Fuel cell

Mazda:
 1991 – Mazda HR-X Hydrogen Wankel Rotary.
 1993 – Mazda HR-X2 Hydrogen Wankel Rotary.
 1993 – Mazda MX-5 Miata Hydrogen Wankel Rotary.
 1995 – Mazda Capella Cargo, first public street test of the hydrogen Wankel Rotary engine.
 1997 – Mazda Demio FC-EV Methanol-Reducing Fuel Cell
 2001 – Mazda Premacy FC-EV – First public street test of the Methanol-Reducing Fuel Cell vehicle in Japan
 2003 – Mazda RX-8 Hydrogen RE Hydrogen \ Gasoline hybrid Wankel Rotary.
 2007 – Mazda Premacy Hydrogen RE Hybrid
 2009 – Mazda 5 Hydrogen RE Hybrid

Mitsubishi:
 2004 – Mitsubishi FCV

Morgan:
 2005 – Morgan LIFEcar-hybrid vehicle-concept car

Nissan:
 2002 – Nissan X-Trail FCHV-hybrid vehicle.  Note, however that in 2009, Nissan announced that it is cancelling its hydrogen car R&D efforts.

Peugeot:
 2004 – Peugeot Quark
 2006 – Peugeot 207 Epure
 2008 – H2Origin-Fuel cell

Renault: 
 Scenic ZEV H2 is a hydro-electric MPV co-developed by Nissan.

Riversimple:
 2009 – Riversimple Urban Car

Ronn Motor Company:
 2008 – Ronn Motor Scorpion

Toyota:
 2002 – Toyota FCHV-hybrid vehicle
 2003 – Toyota Fine-S-concept car
 2003 – Toyota Fine-N-concept car
 2005 – Toyota Fine-T-concept car
 2005 – Toyota Fine-X-concept car
 2008 – Toyota FCHV-adv-preproduction vehicle (expected public release 2015) 

Volkswagen:
 2000 – VW Bora Hy-motion-Fuel cell
 2002 – VW Bora Hy-power-Fuel cell
 2004 – VW Touran Hy-motion-Fuel cell
 2007 – VW space up! blue

Hydrogen powered planes
Hyfish
Smartfish
Tupolev Tu-155-hydrogen-powered version of Tu-154
Antares DLR-H2 -The first aircraft capable of performing a complete flight on fuel-cell power only

Possible future aircraft using precooled jet engines include Reaction Engines Skylon and the Reaction Engines A2.

Hydrogen powered rockets
The following rockets were/are partially or completely propelled by hydrogen fuel:

 Saturn V (upper stage)
 Space Shuttle
 Ariane 5
 Delta IV
 Atlas V (Centaur upper stage)
 CE-20 (cryogenic rocket engine for upper stage of GSLV-III)

Related technologies

Environmental
Anaerobic digestion
Dark fermentation
Photofermentation
Syngas

Nuclear
Generation IV reactor
Hydrogen bomb

Organic chemistry
Dehydrogenation
Hydrogenation
Hydrogenolysis

Miscellaneous
Hydrogen odorant
Atomic hydrogen welding
Hydrogen-cooled turbogenerator
Oxyhydrogen flame
Low hydrogen annealing
Hydrogen decrepitation process (HD) 
Hydrogenation disproportionation desorption and recombination (HDDR)
Standard hydrogen electrode
Reversible hydrogen electrode
Dynamic hydrogen electrode
Palladium-Hydrogen electrode
Cathodic protection
Iron-hydrogen resistor
Hydrogen pinch
Hofmann voltameter
Hydrox
Hydreliox
Joule-Thomson effect
Hydrogen ion
Bussard ramjet
Döbereiner's lamp
Nickel hydrogen battery
Gas-absorption refrigerator
Electroosmotic pump
Sodium silicide
Temperature-programmed reduction
Hydrogen damage
Hydrogen embrittlement

See also

National Center for Hydrogen Technology
 
Methane pyrolysis

References

 
Hydrogen economy
Industrial gases
Hydrogenation